Niels Littooij (born 28 December 1989), better known by his stage name Nielson, is a Dutch singer-songwriter. He was a member of the Dutch music trio Zirkus Zirkus in the early 2010s, but rose to national fame in 2012 due to his participation in the television programme De beste singer-songwriter van Nederland.

Career

1989–2008: Early life and career beginnings
Niels Littooij was born on 28 December 1989 in Dordrecht. His passion for music started when he got a drum kit for his birthday. He also started to play the guitar. As an adolescent, Littooij began to explore his interest for music and participated in several local talent shows. Littooij attended the Herman Brood Academy in Utrecht, an academy that offers education in various fields of profession related to the music industry, where he specialised in rap music. In 2008, Littooij participated in the Kunstbende project, where he won the Rotterdam preliminaries with a rap act. Due to this success, Littooij was asked to perform in the supporting programme of The Opposites.

2009–2011: Part of Zirkus Zirkus
In 2009, Nickelodeon asked Littooij to be part of a new-formed dance and music trio called Zirkus Zirkus. With Zirkus Zirkus, he released several singles and one studio album called In de tent. The trio was aimed at children and they appeared on TV in several Nickelodeon programmes. The trio had some moderate success: three singles charted on the Single Top 100. In 2011, they split up.

2012–2013: Rise to fame
During his education at the Herman Brood Academy, Littooij developed a passion for songwriting, especially for writing Dutch songs. Littooij participated in the 2012 talent show De beste singer-songwriter van Nederland (English: "The best singer-songwriter of the Netherlands"), broadcast by VARA, BNN and 3FM. This was a great opportunity to reach a broader, national, audience for his self-written songs. In the first episode, Littooij performed his song "Beauty & de brains", which became an instant hit. Although Littooij lost the competition in favor of Douwe Bob, he had achieved national fame and popularity.

2013–present: Zo van ah yeah and Met de tijd mee
His song "Beauty & de brains" was released as single and was certified Platinum by the NVPI. Littooij started working on his first studio album, Zo van ah yeah. It was released in March 2014 through Pacemaker Music. Several singles preceded the album, including "Hoe", a Platinum-certified collaboration with Miss Montreal and "Mannenharten", a collaboration with BLØF (the title song of the movie of the same name). The album reached the second position on the Album Top 100.

With the 2014 single "Sexy als ik dans", Littooij achieved his first success in Belgium. It reached the peak position in the Ultratop 50 and was certified Platinum by the Belgian Entertainment Association. The single also performed well in his own country, where it became his third Platinum-certified single. When King Willem-Alexander visited Littooij's home city of Dordrecht on Koningsdag 2015, Littooij was chosen to end the festivities with a performance of "Sexy als ik dans".

In 2015, Littooij released two extended plays called Met de tijd mee, deel 1 en Met de tijd mee, deel 2. Included on the EPs is the single "Sexy als ik dans", among others.

Discography

Albums

Studio albums

Extended plays

Singles

As lead artist

Other appearances

Notes

References

Dutch singer-songwriters
1989 births
Living people
21st-century Dutch singers